The 2015 Latin American Series was the third edition of the Latin American Series, a baseball sporting event played by the champions of the professional winter leagues that make up the Latin American Professional Baseball Association (ALBP).

The competition took place at Estadio Nacional de Panamá in Panama City from January 27 to February 1, 2015.

Participating teams

Group Phase 

|}

Semi-final

Final

Leaders

References

External links 
 Official Site

Latin American Series
Latin American Series
International baseball competitions hosted by Panama
Latin American Series
Latin American Series
Latin American Series
21st century in Panama City
Sports competitions in Panama City